Symphony No. 1 in C minor, is the first symphony by American composer John Knowles Paine.

History

The symphony was composed between 1872 and 1875 and first performed in Boston on January 26, 1876.

Instrumentation

 2 flutes
 2 oboes
 2 clarinets in B-flat (written in C in 4th movement)
 2 bassoons
 4 horns in C, E-flat, and F
 2 trumpets in C and E-flat
 2 tenor trombones
 Bass trombone
 Timpani
 Strings

Structure

The symphony is in four movements:

 Allegro con brio
 Allegro vivace
 Adagio
 Allegro vivace

References

External links
 
 
 
 
 

Paine 01